Ryan Brothers Bus Service is a bus operator in Melbourne, Australia. It operates three routes under contract to Public Transport Victoria.

History
Ryan Brothers Bus Services was formed in 1947 when PJ Callaghan Motor Service was purchased with route 467. In January 1970 the business of G&E Hills was purchased, with route 465.

Fleet
As at July 2022, the fleet consisted of 29 buses and coaches. The fleet livery is light blue with white signwriting.

References

External links

Company website

Bus companies of Victoria (Australia)
Bus transport in Melbourne
Transport companies established in 1947
1947 establishments in Australia